The 109th New York Infantry Regiment was an infantry regiment that served in the Union Army during the American Civil War. The 109th New York was raised in and around Binghamton, New York. It was also known as the Binghamton Regiment and the Railway Brigade.

Service
The regiment was organized in and around Binghamton, New York, and was mustered in for a three-year enlistment on August 27, 1862. It left New York on August 30, 1862, to serve as a guard to the Washington, D.C. railroads in Annapolis Junction, and Laurel, Maryland. On May 4, 1864, the 109th New York served in Virginia. They fought in the Overland Campaign leading up to the Siege of Petersburg, including the battles of The Wilderness, Spotsylvania Courthouse, and Cold Harbor.

The regiment was mustered out of service on June 4, 1865, at the Delaney House in Washington, D.C.

Total strength and casualties
The regiment suffered 5 officers and 160 enlisted men who were killed in action or mortally wounded and 164 enlisted men who died of disease, for a total of 329
fatalities.

Commanders
Colonel Benjamin Tracy
Temporarily Captain Edwin Evans 
Colonel Isaac Catlin

See also
List of New York Civil War regiments
New York in the American Civil War

References

External links
http://www.civilwarindex.com/armyny/109th_ny_infantry.html
https://archive.today/20130620221348/http://www.civilwarintheeast.com/USA/NY/NY109.php
http://www.civilwararchive.com/Unreghst/unnyinf8.htm#11

Infantry 109
1862 establishments in New York (state)
Military units and formations established in 1862
Military units and formations disestablished in 1865